Robert Ingemar Nordmark (born 20 August 1962) is a Swedish former professional ice hockey player. He was the head coach for Almtuna IS in Allsvenskan (the Swedish second division) in the 2007–08 season, but he was replaced by Leif Boork in November 2007 because of poor results. He is a European scout of the Toronto Maple Leafs and used to be a European scout for the Edmonton Oilers. Nordmark is a cousin of former athlete Kenth Eldebrink and former ice hockey defenceman Anders Eldebrink.

Playing career
Nordmark was drafted 191st overall in the 1981 NHL Entry Draft by the Detroit Red Wings, after helping Sweden to their first gold medal at the World Junior Championships in 1981. Despite solid performances in the Swedish Elite League in ensuing years, Nordmark was never signed by the Red Wings and his draft rights lapsed in 1984. After strong performances at the 1986 and 1987 World Championships, Nordmark was re-drafted 59th overall in the 1987 NHL Entry Draft by the St. Louis Blues.

In 1987–88, Nordmark stepped into the Blues' lineup, registering 3 goals and 18 assists for 21 points in 67 games. Following the season, however, he was dealt to the Vancouver Canucks with a draft pick for Dave Richter. In 1988–89 with the Canucks, he would have a career year, registering 6 goals and 35 assists for 41 points while forming a terrific combination on the points of the powerplay with Paul Reinhart. He added an excellent playoffs, with 3 goals and 5 points in 7 games.

However, Nordmark was unable to duplicate his success of 1988–89. In 1989–90, he slumped to just 2 goals and 13 points in 44 games, while his defensive play became increasingly erratic and he became a target for boo-birds at Canuck home games, including being jeered after assisting on an overtime winning goal. The 1990–91 season was another disappointment, as he finished with just 8 points in 45 games, and following the year he was released by the Canucks and allowed to return to Sweden.

Nordmark returned to form in the Elitserien and was a top defender in that league for several more seasons with VIK Västerås HK and Djurgårdens IF, earning another invitation to the World Championships in 1995. He had one of the best seasons of his career in 1995–96, scoring 16 goals and 29 points for Lukko Rauma of the Finnish SM-liiga. He had further stints in Switzerland, Austria, and Britain before retiring in 2001 and moving into coaching. In 2003–04, while coaching Djurgården, came out of retirement in an injury crisis and scored 7 points in 14 games at the age of 41.

Nordmark finished his NHL career with totals of 13 goals and 70 assists for 83 points in 236 games, along with 254 penalty minutes.

Career statistics

Regular season and playoffs

International

External links
 

1962 births
Living people
Arizona Coyotes scouts
Brynäs IF players
Detroit Red Wings draft picks
Djurgårdens IF Hockey players
Edmonton Oilers scouts
Frölunda HC players
Luleå HF players
Nottingham Panthers players
People from Luleå Municipality
St. Louis Blues draft picks
Swedish expatriate ice hockey players in Canada
Swedish expatriate sportspeople in England
Swedish expatriate ice hockey players in the United States
Swedish ice hockey defencemen
Toronto Maple Leafs scouts
Vancouver Canucks players
VIK Västerås HK players
Sportspeople from Norrbotten County